Kaoru Fujiwara (born 17 October 2001) is a Japanese professional footballer who plays as a midfielder for USL League One club New England Revolution II via the New England Revolution academy.

Career

Youth
Fujiwara spent five years with the New England Revolution academy. He made an appearance for the club's USL League One side, New England Revolution II, on 25 July 2020, appearing as a 90th-minute substitute during a 0-0 draw with Union Omaha.

College
Fujiwara has committed to playing college soccer at Harvard University in 2020.

Personal
Fujiwara was born in Obu, Aichi, Japan before moving to Lexington, Massachusetts in the United States when he was 14 years old. His brother, Hikaru, also plays in the New England Revolution academy.

References

2001 births
Association football midfielders

Japanese footballers
Japanese expatriate footballers
Living people
Soccer players from Massachusetts
New England Revolution II players
USL League One players
Harvard Crimson men's soccer players